This page are listed the results of all of the Rio Carnival on year 2015.

Grupo Especial

Série A

Série B

Série C

Série D

Série E

References 

2015